More Retail Private Limited is a national omni-channel food and grocery retailer. MORE operates its stores under two formats. More Supermarkets and More Hypermarkets and also offers online grocery via its mobile app. More Retail was previously known as Aditya Birla Retail Limited when it was part of Aditya Birla Group before More was sold to investors led by Samara Capital and  Amazon. More Retail has a network of 878 Supermarkets in 30 cities and 40 Hypermarkets in 12 cities. 

The company is headquartered in Mumbai and has offices in Kolkata and Bengaluru.

More Retail Limited also provides customers products under its labels.

History 
1986 - K Anjaneyulu and his wife established Trinethra Super Retail, a Hyderabad-based supermarket chain.

2007 - Aditya Birla Group acquired Trinethra Super Retail which was their first retail takeover. Trinethra Super Retail had over 172 stores spread across four states - Andhra Pradesh, Karnataka, Tamil Nadu and Kerala. In Tamil Nadu and Andhra Pradesh, Trinethra brand was being used, while in Karnataka and Kerala, Fabmall brand was being used.  ABG rebranded Trinethra as More Retail.

2008 – More Retail launched More Hypermarket in Baroda and Mysore.

2008-12 – More Retail expanded its footprint to 635 stores across India

2015  - Aditya Birla  Retail Limited  acquired Total Super Stores from Jubilant Agri and Consumer Products Ltd (JACL) 

2016-17 –  Aditya Birla Retail Ltd won the Retail Transformation and Reinvention award for “Retail Transformation and Re-Invention” 

2019 –  WItzig Advisory acquired Aditya Birla Retail from AB Group and rename it as 'More Retail Pvt. Limited'

2022 – More Retail crosses 900+ stores across the country.

Restructuring 
Various news reports, later confirmed by an order from Competition Commission of India, indicated the More was sold by Aditya Birla Group to investors led by private equity fund Samara Capital & E-Commerce player Amazon. Consequently, More is not part of Aditya Birla Group anymore.

References

External links 
 

Companies based in Mumbai
Retail companies of India
Supermarkets of India
Retail companies established in 1988
Indian companies established in 1988
1988 establishments in Maharashtra